Baima is a town of 18,500 people in northeastern Xuanhan County, in northeastern Sichuan province, China, located  northeast of the county seat as the crow flies. , it administers Shuanglong Residential Community and the following five villages
Shaping Village
Guanyan Village
Baizhen Village
Bicheng Village
Ma'an Village

References

External links 
 Introduction by the Dazhou People's Government 

Towns in Sichuan
Xuanhan County